Christianity in Africa first arrived in Egypt in approximately 50 AD, reached the region around Carthage by the end of the second century. In the 4th century, the Aksumite empire in modern-day Ethiopia and Eritrea became one of the first regions in the world to adopt Christianity as their official religion. The Nubian kingdoms of Nobatia, Makuria and Alodia followed two centuries later. Important Africans who influenced the early development of Christianity include Tertullian, Perpetua, Felicity, Clement of Alexandria, Origen of Alexandria, Cyprian, Athanasius and Augustine of Hippo.

The Islamic conquests into North Africa brought pressure on Christians to convert to Islam due to special taxation imposed on non-Muslims and other socio-economic pressures under Muslim rule. The Eastern Orthodox Church of Alexandria and Coptic Orthodox Church of Alexandria (which separated from each other during the Chalcedonian Schism) in Egypt and the Orthodox Tewahedo Church (that split into Ethiopian Orthodox Tewahedo Church and Eritrean Orthodox Tewahedo Church) in the Horn of Africa survived Muslim invasion. Islamization of Muslim-ruled territory occurred progressively over the next few centuries, though this process is not fully understood by historians. Restrictions on church building and demolition of churches in Egypt, along with occasional persecutions such as during the reign of al-Hakim (996–1021), put additional pressure on Copts in Egypt. The Ethiopian Empire was the only region of Africa to survive as a Christian state after the expansion of Islam. The Ethiopian church held its own distinct religious customs and a unique canon of the Bible. Therefore, the Ethiopian church community is globally unique in that it wasn't Christianised through European missionaries, but was highly independent and itself spread missionaries throughout the rest of Africa prior to European Christians contact with the continent. The P'ent'ay churches are however works of a Protestant reformation within Ethiopian Christianity. The position of the head of the Catholic Church of Africa (Archdiocese of Carthage), the only one permitted to preach in the continent, belonged to the bishop of Morocco in 1246. The bishopric of Marrakesh continued to exist until the late 16th century.

Today, Christianity is embraced by the majority of the population in most Southern African, Southeast African, and Central African states and others in large parts of Horn of Africa and West Africa. The Coptic Christians make up a significant minority in Egypt. As of 2020, Christians formed 49% of the continent's population, with Muslims forming 42%. In a relatively short time, Africa has risen from having a majority of followers of indigenous, traditional religions, to being predominantly a continent of Christians and Muslims. Since 2013, traditional African religions are declared as the majority religion only in Togo. Importantly, today within most self-declared Christian communities in Africa, there is a significant and sustained syncretism with African Traditional Religious beliefs and practices and African Christianity.

A 2018 study by the Gordon–Conwell Theological Seminary discovered that more Christians live in Africa than any other continent, with 631 million Christians throughout the landmass. The study also states that Latin America has the second-highest number of Christians at 601 million Christians, while Europe has the third-highest with 571 million Christians.

According to updated data for 2021, there are now nearly 685 million Christians in Africa, with 760 million expected by 2025. This surpasses earlier estimates of 630 million to 700 million for 2025: "By 2025, that number is expected to nearly double, to somewhere between 630 and 700 million believers."

History

Early Church 
Mark the Evangelist became the first bishop of the Alexandrian Patriarchate in about the year 43. At first the church in Alexandria was mainly Greek-speaking. By the end of the 2nd century the scriptures and liturgy had been translated into three local languages. Christianity in Sudan also spread in the early 1st century, and the Nubian churches, which were established in the sixth century within the kingdoms of Nobatia, Makuria and Alodia were linked to those of Egypt.

Christianity also grew in northwestern Africa (today known as the Maghreb). The churches there were linked to the Church of Rome and provided Pope Gelasius I, Pope Miltiades and Pope Victor I, all of them Christian Berbers like Saint Augustine and his mother Saint Monica.

At the beginning of the 3rd century the church in Alexandria expanded rapidly, with five new suffragan bishoprics. At this time, the Bishop of Alexandria began to be called Pope, as the senior bishop in Egypt. In the middle of the 3rd century the church in Egypt suffered severely in the persecution under the Emperor Decius. Many Christians fled from the towns into the desert. When the persecution died down, however, some remained in the desert as hermits to pray. This was the beginning of Christian monasticism, which over the following years spread from Africa to other parts of the Gohar, and Europe through France and Ireland.

The early 4th century in Egypt began with renewed persecution under the Emperor Diocletian. In the Ethiopian/Eritrean Kingdom of Aksum, King Ezana declared Christianity the official religion after having been converted by Frumentius, resulting in the promotion of Christianity in Ethiopia (eventually leading to the foundation of the Ethiopian Orthodox Tewahedo Church).

In these first few centuries, African Christian leaders such as Origen, Lactantius, Augustine, Tertullian, Marius Victorinus, Pachomius, Didymus the Blind, Ticonius, Cyprian, Athanasius and Cyril (along with rivals Valentinus, Plotinus, Arius and Donatus Magnus) influenced the Christian world outside Africa with responses to Gnosticism, Arianism, Montanism, Marcionism, Pelagianism and Manichaeism, and the idea of the university (after the Library of Alexandria), understanding of the Trinity, Vetus Latina translations, methods of exegesis and biblical interpretation, ecumenical councils, monasticism, Neoplatonism and African literary, dialectical and rhetorical traditions.

After the Muslim conquest of North Africa 

After the Muslim conquests, most of the early Muslim caliphs showed little interest in converting the local people to Islam. Christianity continued to exist after the Muslim conquests. Initially, Muslims remained a ruling minority within the conquered territories in the Middle East and North Africa. Overall, the non-Muslim population became a minority in these regions by the 12th century. The factors and processes that led to the Islamization of these regions, as well as the speed at which conversions happened, is a complex subject. Among other rules, the Muslim rulers imposed a special poll tax, the jizya, on non-Muslims, which acted as an economic pressure to convert alongside other social advantages converts could gain in Muslim society. The Catholic church gradually declined along with local Latin dialect.

Historians have considered many theories to explain the decline of Christianity in North Africa, proposing diverse factors such as the recurring internal wars and external invasions in the region during late antiquity, Christian fears of persecution by the invaders, schisms and a lack of leadership within the Christian church in Africa, political pragmatism among the inhabitants under the new regime, and a possible lack of differentiation between early Islamic and local Christian theologies that may have made it easier for laymen to accept the new religion. Some Christians, especially those with financial means, also left for Europe. In the lands west of Egypt, the Church at that time lacked the backbone of a monastic tradition and was still suffering from the aftermath of heresies including the so-called Donatist heresy, and one theory proposes this as a factor that contributed to the early obliteration of the Church in the present day Maghreb. Proponents of this theory compare this situation with the strong monastic tradition in Egypt and Syria, where Christianity remained more vigorous. In addition, the Romans and the Byzantines were unable to completely assimilate the indigenous people like the Berbers. 

Some historians remark how the Umayyad Caliphate persecuted many Berber Christians in the 7th and 8th centuries CE, who slowly converted to Islam. Other modern historians further recognize that the Christian populations living in the lands invaded by the Arab Muslim armies between the 7th and 10th centuries CE suffered religious persecution, religious violence, and martyrdom multiple times at the hands of Arab Muslim officials and rulers;  many were executed under the Islamic death penalty for defending their Christian faith through dramatic acts of resistance such as refusing to convert to Islam, repudiation of the Islamic religion and subsequent reconversion to Christianity, and blasphemy towards Muslim beliefs. 

From the Muslim conquest of Egypt onwards, the Coptic Christians were persecuted by different Muslim regimes. Islamization was likely slower in Egypt than in other Muslim-controlled regions. Up until the Fatimid period (10th to 12th centuries), Christians likely still constituted a majority of the population, although scholarly estimates on this issue are tentative and vary between authors. Under the reign of the Fatimid Caliph al-Hakim (r. 96–1021), an exceptional persecution of Christians occurred, This included closing and demolishing churches and forced conversion to Islam, which brought about a wave of conversions.

There are reports that the Roman Catholic faith persisted in the region from Tripolitania (present-day western Libya) to present-day Morocco for several centuries after the completion of the Arab conquest by 700. A Christian community is recorded in 1114 in Qal'a in central Algeria. There is also evidence of religious pilgrimages after 850 to tombs of Catholic saints outside the city of Carthage, and evidence of religious contacts with Christians of Muslim Spain. In addition, calendar reforms adopted in Europe at this time were disseminated amongst the indigenous Christians of Tunis, which would have not been possible had there been an absence of contact with Rome.

Local Christians came under pressure when the Muslim regimes of the Almohads and Almoravids came into power, and the record shows demands made that the local Christians of Tunis convert to Islam. There are reports of Christian inhabitants and a bishop in the city of Kairouan around 1150 AD - a significant event, since this city was founded by Arab Muslims around 680 AD as their administrative center after their conquest. A letter in Catholic Church archives from the 14th century shows that there were still four bishoprics left in North Africa, admittedly a sharp decline from the over four hundred bishoprics in existence at the time of the Arab conquest. The Almohad Abd al-Mu'min forced the Christians and Jews of Tunis to convert in 1159. Ibn Khaldun hinted at a native Christian community in 14th century in the villages of Nefzaoua, south-west of Tozeur. These paid the jizyah and had some people of Frankish descent among them. Berber Christians continued to live in Tunis and Nefzaoua in the south of Tunisia up until the early 15th century, and in the first quarter of the 15th century we even read that the native Christians of Tunis, though much assimilated, extended their church, perhaps because the last Christians from all over the Maghreb had gathered there. However, they were not in communion with the Catholic church. The community of Tunisian Christians existed in the town of Tozeur up to the 18th century.

Another group of Christians who came to North Africa after being deported from Islamic Spain were called the Mozarabic. They were recognised as forming the Moroccan Church by Pope Innocent IV.

In June 1225, Honorius III issued the bull Vineae Domini custodes that permitted two friars of the Dominican Order named Dominic and Martin to establish a mission in Morocco and look after the affairs of Christians there. The bishop of Morocco Lope Fernandez de Ain was made the head of the Church of Africa, the only church officially allowed to preach in the continent, on 19 December 1246 by Innocent IV.

The medieval Moroccan historian Ibn Abi Zar stated that the Almohad caliph Abu al-Ala Idris al-Ma'mun had built a church in Marrakech for the Christians to freely practice their faith at Fernando III's insistence. IV asked emirs of Tunis, Ceuta and Bugia to permit Lope and Franciscian friars to look after the Christians in those regions. He thanked the Caliph al-Sa'id for granting protection to the Christians and requested to allow them to create fortresses along the shores, but the Caliph rejected this request.

Jesuit missions in Africa 
Another phase of Christianity in Africa began with the arrival of Portuguese in the 15th century. After the end of Reconquista, the Christian Portuguese and Spanish captured many ports in North Africa.

Missionary expeditions undertaken by the Society of Jesus (Jesuits) began as early as 1548 in various regions of Africa. In 1561, Gonçalo da Silveira, a Portuguese missionary, managed to baptize Monomotapa, king of the Shona people in the territory of Zimbabwe. A modest sized group of Jesuits began to establish their presence in the area of Abyssinia, or Ethiopia Superior, around the same time of Silveira's presence in Southern Africa. Although Jesuits regularly confronted persecution and harassment, their mission withstood the test of time for nearly a century. Despite this confrontation, they found success in instituting Catholic doctrine in a region that, prior to the existence of their vocation, maintained strictly established orthodoxies. During the sixteenth century, Jesuits extended their mission into the old Kongo Kingdom, developing upon a preexisting Catholic mission which had culminated in the construction of a local church. Jesuit missions functioned similarly in Mozambique and Angola until in 1759 the Society was overcome by Portuguese authority.

The Jesuits went largely unchallenged by rival denominational missions in Africa. Other religious congregations did exist who sought to evangelize regions of the continent under Portuguese dominion, however, their influence was far less significant than that of the Christians. The Jesuit's ascendency to prominence began with the padroado in the fifteenth century and continued until other European countries initiated missions of their own, threatening Portugal's status as sole patron of the continent. The favor of the Jesuits took a negative turn in the mid eighteenth century when Portugal no longer held the same dominion in Africa as it had in the fifteenth century. The Jesuits found themselves expelled from Mozambique and Angola, as a result, the existence of Catholic missions diminished significantly in these regions.

The Maghreb 

The bishopric of Marrakesh continued to exist until the late 16th century and was borne by the suffragans of Seville. Juan de Prado who had attempted to re-establish the mission was killed in 1631. A Franciscan monastery built in 1637 was destroyed in 1659 after the downfall of the Saadi dynasty. A small Franciscan chapel and monastery in the mellah of the city existed until the 18th century.

The growth of Catholicism in the region after the French conquest was built on European colonizers and settlers, and these immigrants and their descendants mostly left when the countries of the region became independent. As of the last census in Algeria, taken on 1 June 1960, there were 1,050,000 non-Muslim civilians (mostly Catholic) in Algeria (10 percent of the total population including 140,000 Algerian Jews). Under French rule, the Catholic population of Algeria peaked at over one million.  Due to the exodus of the pieds-noirs in the 1960s, more North African Christians of Berber or Arab descent now live in France than in Greater Maghreb.

In 2009, the UNO counted 45,000 Roman Catholics and 50,000 to 100,000 Protestants in Algeria. Conversions to Christianity have been most common in Kabylie, especially in the wilaya of Tizi Ouzou. In that wilaya, the proportion of Christians has been estimated to be between 1% and 5%. A 2015 study estimates 380,000 Muslims converted to Christianity in Algeria.

Before the independence in 1956; Morocco was home to half a million Europeans, mostly Christians. The numbers of the Catholics in French Morocco reached about 360,000 or about 4.1% of the population. In 1950, Catholics in Spanish protectorate in Morocco and Tangier constitute 14.5% of the population, and the Spanish Morocco was home to 113,000 Catholic settlers. Catholics in Spanish protectorate in Morocco and Tangier were mostly of Spanish descent, and to a lesser extent of Portuguese, French and Italian ancestry. The U.S. State Department estimates the number of Moroccan Christians as more than 40,000. Pew-Templeton estimates the number of Moroccan Christians at 20,000. Most Christians reside in the Casablanca, Tangier and Rabat urban areas. The majority of Christians in Morocco are foreigners, although some reports states that there is a growing number of native Moroccans (45,000) converting to Christianity, especially in the rural areas. Many of the converts are baptized secretly in Morocco's churches. Since 1960 a growing number of Moroccan Muslims are converting to Christianity.

Before the independence in 1956; Tunisia was home to 255,000 Europeans, mostly Christians. The Christian community in Tunisia, composed of indigenous residents, Tunisians of Italian and French descent, and a large group of native-born citizens of Berber and Arab descent, numbers 50,000 and is dispersed throughout the country. The Office for Democracy, Human Rights and Labor in the United States also noted the presence of thousands of Tunisians who converted to Christianity.

Some scholars and media reports indicate that there been increasing numbers of conversions to Christianity among the Berbers.

Africanizing Christianity

Within different geographical areas, Africans searched for aspects of Christianity that could more closely resemble their religious and personal practices. Adaptations of Protestantism, such as the Kimbanguist church emerged. Within the Kimbanguist church, Simon Kimbangu questioned the order of religious deliverance- would God send a white man to preach? The Kimbanguist church believed Jesus was black and regarded symbols with different weight than the Catholic and Protestant Europeans. The common practice of placing crosses and crucifixes in churches was viewed as a graven image in their eyes or a form of idolatry. Also, according to Mazrui, Kimbanguists respected the roles of women in church more than orthodox churches; they gave women the roles of priests and preachers. Members within these churches looked for practices in the Bible that were not overtly condemned, such as polygamy. They also incorporated in their own practices relationships with objects and actions like dancing and chanting. When Africans were able to read in the vernacular, they were able to interpret the Bible in their own light. Polygamy was a topic of debate- many literate Africans interpreted it as acceptable because of information contained in the Old Testament- while it was condemned by European Christianity. Dona Beatriz was a woman from Central Africa known for her controversial views on the acceptance of polygamy – she argued that Jesus never condemned it – and she was burnt at the stake. European missionaries were faced with what they considered an issue in maintaining Victorian values, while still promoting the vernacular and literacy. Missionaries largely condemned the controversial African views and worked against leaders branching out. Simon Kimbangu became a martyr, put in a cage because of Western missionaries concern, and died there.

Within African communities, there were clashes brought on by Christianization. As a religion meant to "colonize the conscience and consciousness of the colonized" Christianity caused disputes even amongst hereditary leaders, such as between Khama III and his father Sekgoma in nineteenth-century Botswana. Young leaders formed ideas based on Christianity and challenged elders. Dona Beatriz, an African prophet, made Christianity political and eventually went on to become an African Nationalist, planning to overthrow the Ugandan state with the help of other prophets. According to Paul Kollman, teaching from missionaries was up to the interpretation of each person and took different forms when acted upon.

David Adamo, a Nigerian within the Aladura church chose portions of the Bible that closely resembled what his church found important. They read portions of Psalms because of the idea that missionaries were not sharing the power of their faith. They found power in reading these verses and put them into the context of their lives.

In addition to Africanizing Christianity, there were movements to Africanize Islam. In Nigeria, movements were created to arouse Muslims to de-Arabize Islam. There were clashes between people who accepted the de-Arabization and those who did not. These movements took place around 1980, resulting in violent behavior and clashes with police. Mirza Ghulam Ahmed, the founder of the Ahmadiyya sect, believed that Muhammed was the most important prophet, but not the last- departing from typical Muslim views. Sunni Africans were largely against the Ahmadiyyas; the Ahmadiyyas were the first to translate the Quran into Swahili, and the Sunnis opposed that as well. There was a militarism developed in different groups and movements like the Ahmadiyyas and the Mahdist movement and clashes between groups with opposing views.

The influenza pandemic of 1918 accelerated the Africanization of Christianity and hence its growth in twentieth century Africa. As many as five million Africans are estimated to have died. European governments, churches and medicine were powerless against the plague, boosting anti-imperial sentiment. This contributed to growth of independent and prophetic Christian mass movements with prophecy, healings, and nationalist church restructuring. For example, the inception of the Aladura movement in Nigeria coincided with the pandemic. Evolving into the Christ Apostolic Church, it gave rise to many offshoots, which continued to emerge into the 1950s spreading with migrants around the world. For example, the Redeemed Christian Church of God, founded in 1952, has congregations in a dozen African states, Western Europe and North America.

Christian education in Africa 
Christians and Muslims built schools throughout the continent of Africa, teaching missionary beliefs and philosophies. Since the Quran must only be recited in Arabic, It is necessary that a practitioner of the Muslim faith reads and understands the meaning of Arabic words in order to recite and/or memorize the Quran. As a result of the nature of Islam in Africa, Muslim missionaries were not prompted to translate their sacred text into the native language. Unlike that of Islam, Christian missionaries were compelled to spread an understanding of their gospel in the native language of the indigenous people they sought to convert. The bible was then translated and communicated in these native languages. Christian schools did teach English, as well as mathematics, philosophy, and values inherent to Western culture and civilization. The conflicting branches of secularism and religiosity within the Christian schools represents a divergence between the various goals of educational institutions within Africa.

Current status

Christianity is now one of the two most widely practiced religions in Africa. There has been tremendous growth in the number of Christians in Africa - coupled by a relative decline in adherence to traditional African religions. Only nine million Christians were in Africa in 1900, but by the year 2000, there were an estimated 380 million Christians. According to a 2006 Pew Forum on Religion and Public life study, 147 million African Christians were "renewalists" (Pentecostals and Charismatics). According to David Barrett, most of the 552,000 congregations in 11,500 denominations throughout Africa in 1995 are completely unknown in the West. Much of the recent Christian growth in Africa is now due to indigenous African missionary work and evangelism and high birth rates, rather than European missionaries. Christianity in Africa shows tremendous variety, from the ancient forms of Oriental Orthodox Christianity in Egypt, Ethiopia, and Eritrea to the newest African-Christian denominations of Nigeria, a country that has experienced large conversion to Christianity in recent times. Several syncretistic and messianic sections have formed throughout much of the continent, including the Nazareth Baptist Church in South Africa and the Aladura churches in Nigeria. Some evangelical missions founded in Africa such as the UD-OLGC, founded by Evangelist Dag Heward-Mills, are also quickly spreading in influence all around the world. There are also fairly widespread populations of Seventh-day Adventists and Jehovah's Witnesses.

Some experts predict the shift of Christianity's center from the European industrialized nations to Africa and Asia in modern times. Yale University historian Lamin Sanneh stated that "African Christianity was not just an exotic, curious phenomenon in an obscure part of the world, but that African Christianity might be the shape of things to come." The statistics from the World Christian Encyclopedia (David Barrett) illustrate the emerging trend of dramatic Christian growth on the continent and supposes, that in 2025 there will be 633 million Christians in Africa.

A 2015 study estimates 2,161,000 Christian believers are from a formerly Muslim background in Africa, most of them belonging to some form of Protestantism.

The rise of the megachurch
Megachurches (defined as churches with weekend attendances of at least 2,000) are found in many countries of Sub-Saharan Africa, including Tanzania, Nigeria, South Africa, Ghana, Kenya, and Uganda. They are mostly of Pentecostal denominations. The largest church auditorium, Glory Dome, was inaugurated in 2018 with 100,000 seats, in Abuja, Nigeria.

Statistics by country

Denominations

Catholicism

Roman Catholic

Catholic Church membership rose from 2 million in 1900 to 140 million in 2000. In 2005, the Catholic Church in Africa, including Eastern Catholic Churches, was followed by approximately 135 million of the 809 million people in Africa. In 2009, when Pope Benedict XVI visited Africa, it was estimated at 158 million. Most belong to the Latin Church, but there are also millions of members of the Eastern Catholic Churches.

Orthodoxy

Oriental Orthodoxy

 Ethiopian Orthodox Tewahedo Church – 37 million
 Coptic Orthodox Church of Alexandria – 10 million
 Eritrean Orthodox Tewahedo Church – 2 million

Eastern Orthodoxy

 Greek Orthodox Church of Alexandria – 500 000

Protestantism
Protestantism is the largest Christian group in Africa, with 35.9% (more than a half) in sub-Saharan Africa. Protestant have grown to 35.9% of the whole population of the continent. The three countries with more Protestant population are: Nigeria with 60 million (37.7% of the population), Kenya with 48 million (84% of the population), and South Africa with 24 million (47.7% of the population), these three countries add up to around 121 million Protestants.

Anglicanism

Church of Nigeria – 20.1 million
 Church of Uganda – 8.1 million
 Anglican Church of Kenya – 5.0 million
 Episcopal Church of South Sudan and Sudan – 4.5 million
 Anglican Church of Southern Africa – 2.3 million
 Anglican Church of Tanzania – 2.0 million
 Anglican Church of Rwanda – 1.0 million
 Church of the Province of Central Africa – 0.9 million
 Anglican Church of Burundi – 0.8 million
 Church of Christ in Congo–Anglican Community of Congo – 0.5 million
 Church of the Province of West Africa – 0.3 million
 Reformed Evangelical Anglican Church of South Africa – 0.09 million

Baptists

 Nigerian Baptist Convention – 5.0 million
 Baptist Union of Uganda – 2.5 million
 Baptist Community of Congo – 2.1 million
 Baptist Convention of Tanzania – 2.0 million
 Baptist Community of the Congo River – 1.1 million
 Baptist Convention of Kenya – 0.6 million
 Baptist Convention of Malawi – 0.3 million
 Ghana Baptist Convention – 0.3
 Union of Baptist Churches in Rwanda – 0.3 million
 Evangelical Baptist Church of the Central African Republic – 0.2 million

Catholic Apostolic Church (Irvingism)

 New Apostolic Church – 16 million

Lutheranism
Lutheranism in Africa represent 24.13 million people.

 Ethiopian Evangelical Church Mekane Yesus – 8.3 million
 Evangelical Lutheran Church in Tanzania – 6.5 million
 Malagasy Lutheran Church – 3.0 million
 The Lutheran Church of Christ in Nigeria – 2.2 million
 Evangelical Lutheran Church in Namibia – 0.7 million
 Evangelical Lutheran Church in Southern Africa – 0.6 million
 Evangelical Lutheran Church in the Republic of Namibia – 0.4 million
 Evangelical Lutheran Church of Cameroon – 0.3 million
 Evangelical Lutheran Church in Zimbabwe – 0.3 million

Methodism

With over 20 denominations in the continent, World Methodist Council has 17.08 members in the whole continent.

 Methodist Church Nigeria – 2 million
 Methodist Church of Southern Africa – 1.7 million
 United Methodist Church of Ivory Coast – 1.08 million
 Methodist Church Ghana – 0.8 million
 Methodist Church in Kenya – 0.5 million
 The United Methodist Church in Liberia – 0.35 million
 Free Methodist church in Congo– 0.11 million

Reformed (Calvinism)

 Presbyterian Church of East Africa – 4.0 million
 Presbyterian Church of Nigeria – 3.8 million
 Presbyterian Church of Africa – 3.4 million
 Church of Christ in Congo–Presbyterian Community of Congo – 2.5 million
 Presbyterian Church of Cameroon – 1.8 million
 Church of Central Africa Presbyterian – 1.3 million
 Presbyterian Church in Sudan – 1.0 million
 Presbyterian Church in Cameroon – 0.7 million
 Evangelical Presbyterian Church, Ghana – 0.6 million
 Uniting Presbyterian Church in Southern Africa – 0.5 million
 Presbyterian Church in Rwanda – 0.3 million
Church of Jesus Christ in Madagascar – 3.5 million
 United Church in Zambia – 3.0 million
 Evangelical Church of Cameroon – 2.5 million
 Dutch Reformed Church in South Africa (NGK) – 1.1 million
 Uniting Reformed Church in Southern Africa – 0.5 million
 Lesotho Evangelical Church – 0.3 million
 Christian Reformed Church of Nigeria – 0.3 million
 Reformed Church in Zambia – 0.3 million
 Evangelical Reformed Church in Angola – 0.2 million
 Church of Christ in the Sudan Among the Tiv – 0.2 million
 Evangelical Church of Congo – 0.2 million
Evangelical Congregational Church in Angola – 0.9 million
 United Congregational Church of Southern Africa – 0.5 million

Pentecostalism
The population of Pentecostal Christians is around 20.292 million in 2015, being 35.32 percent of the continent's Christian population. 
Ethiopian Kale Heywet Church  – 9 million
Ethiopian Full Gospel Believers' Church  – 4.5 million
  – 1 million
General Council of the Assemblies of God Nigeria - 3.6 million
Apostolic Faith Mission of South Africa – 1.2 million
 Association of Pentecostal Churches of Rwanda – 1 million

Mennonites

Meserete Kristos Church – 0.47 million

Other evangelical groups
Evangelical church of west africa – 5 million

Other Christian groups

African-initiated churches
60 million people are members of African-initiated churches.
Zion Christian Church – 15 million
 Eternal Sacred Order of Cherubim and Seraphim – 10 million
 Kimbanguist Church – 5.5 million
 Redeemed Christian Church of God – 5 million
 Church of the Lord (Aladura) – 3.6 million
 Council of African Instituted Churches – 3 million
 Church of Christ Light of the Holy Spirit – 1.4 million
 African Church of the Holy Spirit – 0.7 million
 African Israel Church Nineveh – 0.5 million

Restorationism

 The Church of Jesus Christ of Latter-day Saints – 0.6 million

See also 
African theology
Afrikaner Calvinism
Christianity and colonialism
Christian mysticism in ancient Africa
Roman Catholicism in Africa
Traditional African religion

Notes

References

External links

 BBC - The Story of Africa and Christianity
 African Christian
 African Christianity Faq
 Modern Evangelical African Theologians: A Primer